Saint Diomedes of Tarsus (Diomede) (Greek: Διομήδης ό Ταρσεύς, d. between 298 and 311 AD) is venerated as a Greek Christian saint and martyr, one of the Holy Unmercenaries.

Life
Diomedes was born in Tarsus. He was a physician by profession and a zealous Christian evangelist. He traveled a good deal preaching the faith. When he arrived at Nicaea, Diocletian ordered him arrested. On route to Nicomedia, Diomedes paused to pray and then died. The soldiers took his head as proof he had been arrested. One source states, "It is said that when his head was taken to the emperor, that all were blinded, and only after his body has been returned and they had prayed, was their sight restored."

Named for him
His feast day is 16 August (O.S.).  There is a fresco of him at the monastery of Hilandar on Mount Athos, Greece.

The Diomede Islands off the coast of Alaska derive their name from this saint. Vitus Bering sighted the Diomede Islands on 16 August (O.S., 27 August N.S.) 1728, the day when the Russian Orthodox Church celebrates the memory of Saint Diomedes during the Nut Feast of the Saviour.

Saint Diomedes (II)
There is another Saint Diomedes who is celebrated on 2 September.  With Julian, Philip, Theodore, Eutychian (Eutykhian), Hesychius (Heyschios), Leonides, Philadelphus (Philadelphos), Menalippus (Melanippos), and Pantagapes (Parthagapa) he was martyred at an unknown date and site.  They suffered various forms of execution (burning at the stake, drowning, beheading, or crucifixion).

References

External links
Saint of the Day, August 16: Diomedes of Tarsus  at SaintPatrickDC.org
Diomedes the Physician & Martyr of Tarsus
St. Diomedes, Holy Doctor/Martyr, fresco from 19th century. The King Milutin's church of the Hilandar Monastery on Mt. Athos
Troparia and Kontakia: August 16, Diomedes

Saints from Roman Anatolia
4th-century Christian martyrs
4th-century Romans
People from Tarsus, Mersin
Holy Unmercenaries
Year of birth unknown
3rd-century Roman physicians
3rd-century Greek physicians